Carin Strömberg (born 10 July 1993) is a Swedish handball player for Neptunes de Nantes and the Swedish national team.

She competed at the 2015 World Women's Handball Championship in Denmark.

Individual awards
 Most Valuable Player of the Youth World Championship: 2010

References

External links

1993 births
Living people
Swedish female handball players
People from Nacka Municipality
Expatriate handball players
Swedish expatriate sportspeople in Denmark
Handball players at the 2016 Summer Olympics
Olympic handball players of Sweden
Viborg HK players
Handball players at the 2020 Summer Olympics
Sportspeople from Stockholm County
21st-century Swedish women